Shefer (lit. beauty) is a moshav in northern Israel. Located near Safed, it falls under the jurisdiction of Merom HaGalil Regional Council.

History
The moshav was founded in 1950 as a work village for immigrants to Israel from Yemen on the land of the depopulated Palestinian village of Farradiyya. After the founders abandoned it, a new moshav was founded in the same location by immigrants from North Africa.

The name "Shefer" is borrowed from the blessing Jacob bestowed on Naftali in the Book of Genesis (49:21).

References

Moshavim
Populated places in Northern District (Israel)
Yemeni-Jewish culture in Israel
Populated places established in 1950
1950 establishments in Israel
North African-Jewish culture in Israel